Sencillamente Nunca is a 1978 album by Mr. Loco.

Track listing
 "Sencillamente Nunca"
 "Zapatos De Ante Azul, Cover"
 "Tutti Frutti-La Plaga, Cover"
 "Mambo No 5, Cover"
 "Telegrama De México"
 "Superman"
 "Viva Zapata (En Español)"
 "Pumping Piano"
 "Tequila"
 "Rockin robin, Cover"
 "Rock nugga, Master Yoda love"

1978 albums
Mister Loco albums